Miss Europe 1963 was the 26th edition of the Miss Europe pageant and the 15th edition under the Mondial Events Organization. It was held at the Casino du Liban in Beirut, Lebanon on 7 June 1963. Mette Stenstad of Norway, was crowned Miss Europe 1963 by out going titleholder Maruja García Nicoláu of Spain.

Results

Placements

Contestants 

 - Rosemarie Winkler
 - Irène Godin
 - Aino Korwa (Korva)
 - Susan Pratt
 - Marja-Liisa Ståhlberg
 - Sabine Surget
 - Gisela Karschuck
 - Aleka Aktseli
 - Juno Onink
 - Liney Friðfinnsdóttir
 - Gianna Erbetta (real name: Gianna Serra)
 - Sylvie Welter
 - Mette Stenstad
 - Maria José Santos Trindade Defolloy
 - María del Carmen Abreu Martínez
 - Grete Qviberg
 - Diane Tanner
 - Sevim Emre

Notes

Returns

References

External links 
 

Miss Europe
1963 beauty pageants
1963 in Lebanon